This is a list of single-season records in Major League Baseball.

Batting records

Overview (1876–present)

Home runs

Most Grand Slams By a Pitcher in One Season: Tony Cloninger, Madison Bumgarner, 2

Hits

Batting average

Runs batted in

Hitting streak

Runs scored

Doubles

Triples

At bats

Stolen bases

Pitching records

Overview

Live-ball era (1920–present)
(if different from above)

Wins

Post 19th Century

Live-ball era (post-1920)

Earned run average

Strikeouts

Shutouts

Saves

Balks

Wild pitches

Catcher records
Most runners caught stealing: Jody Davis, 89 (1986)
Most stolen bases allowed: Mike Piazza, 155 (1996)
Highest caught-stealing %: Mike LaValliere, 72.73% (1993)
Most no-hitters caught: 2, Carlos Ruiz (2010) and Wilson Ramos (2015) (List of Major League Baseball no-hitters)
Both of Ruiz's no-hitters were by Roy Halladay; the second was in Game 1 of the National League Division Series, Halladay's first career postseason start. Both of Ramos' no-hitters were by Max Scherzer.

In 1914, Yankees catcher Les Nunamaker threw out three runners in the same inning.

Team records

Hits

Home runs

Runs batted in

Runs scored

Notes

References

Major League Baseball records